is a Swedish cartoon created by Rune Andréasson. The highly popular children's cartoon first emerged as a series of television short films as well as a weekly half-page Sunday strip in 1966, before being published periodically in its own comic magazine since 1973.

Andréasson did all the artwork himself until 1975 and wrote all the comics until 1990. Francisco Tora did all the illustrations from 1976 until he was joined by Bo Michanek in 1983. Several new writers and illustrators were hired in the early 1990s, including Claes Reimerthi, Olof Siverbo, Johan Wanloo and Tony Cronstam. Andréasson continued to do the magazine cover illustrations until 1992.

The series somewhat changed direction when Bamse had children, specifically triplets, in 1982. He had a fourth child in 1986, and his friend Lille Skutt had one at the same time; this saw the series focus more on family, while also discussing other values such as gender equality. In 1989, the character Skalman noticed that Bamse's fourth child Brumma had some intellectual disability, later defined as Asperger syndrome, which again brought up the subject of equality. The children did develop in real time within the magazine, but seem to have been fixed in age since around 1990. They are now around nine years old, in a narratively advantageous eternal state as third-graders.

Both the early Sunday strips and the early magazines have since been reprinted as glossy hardbound volumes.

In 1998, the theme park 'Bamses Värld' ("Bamse's World") started as an attraction at the Kolmården Wildlife Park, with theater performances, restaurants and houses from the comic.

Characters

Protagonists 
 Bamse, the main character, is a brown bear who becomes the world's strongest bear by eating a type of honey called dunderhonung (lit. "thunder-honey"), specially prepared for him by his grandmother. (Almost) anyone else who eats it, apart from Bamse's pet bee and his daughter Brumma, ends up with three days of stomach ache. Bamse is also the kindest bear in the world (according to the comic), and is often seen helping those in need. The name Bamse comes from a Scandinavian word for "bear" or "teddy bear". "Bamse" can also translate to "giant" or "big one", though that would be something of a misnomer, as Bamse is rather diminutive in size compared to many of the other characters.
 Brummelisa ("Growlelisa") is the daughter of a forester who could always rely on Bamse helping out; soon they fell in love. In 1981, they all went on a boat trip to the north of Scandinavia (financed by individual odd jobs), climaxing in a view of the midnight sun (an anti-climax to grandma's cat and mouse who expected it to look different). Back home, Brummelisa and Bamse staged a secret wedding and became parents to triplets: Brum ("Growl"), Teddy, Nalle-Maja ("Teddy-Maja"). Brum is artistically gifted, but somewhat shy. Teddy spends a lot of time by himself, and loves reading and learning. Nalle-Maja is the most extrovert kid, and loves sports and activities. Once their personalities began to shine through Teddy gravitated towards Skalman who noticed what the others failed to; Teddy's clumsiness stems from his eyesight and only needed a pair of glasses. Nalle-Maja has inherited more than just her father's looks; she also inherited his ability to get strong from the dunderhonung. To prevent her from injuring herself or her brothers, Bamse's grandmother attempted a new dunderhonung recipe to avoid making her strong. She partially succeeded; Nalle-Maja draws strength from it, but also winds up with the stomach ache. Late 1985 the triplets were informed on the arrival of another sibling; Brumma ("Growla"), who - when eating Dunderhonung - neither gets strong nor is affected by the stomach ache.
 Lille Skutt ("Little Hop") is Bamse's and Skalman's best friend. He is a very fast but notoriously frightened white rabbit with a red bow tie. However, his ability to run quick and jump far (not to mention braving his fears whenever someone he cares about is in danger) has saved his friends' skins on more than one occasion. Lille Skutt is the village postman, albeit on a part-time basis. He also works part-time as the head chef of the local restaurant. Like Bamse, Skutt ended up marrying his girlfriend; Nina Kanin ("Nina Rabbit"), best friend with Brummelisa. Nina and Skutt became parents to a son Mini-Hopp ("Mini-Hop"), a hyperactive kid with an apparent lack of fear. He has eight siblings including Happ. Happ is a gay rabbit. He and his life-partner Lille Sixten have adopted a little girl named Suddan, who's slightly younger than Mini-Hopp.
 Skalman ("Shellman" / "Shellback") is an ingenious tortoise who invents all sorts of things, including spacecraft and time machines. He stores just about anything in his carapace except for locomotives, spaceships or atlantic steamboats (and also firewood, due to him getting splinters in the back). Skalman seems to be a polyphasic sleeper, and according to himself, his best invention is the food-and-sleep clock, whose calls he follows slavishly, even at times when sleep seems highly inappropriate. To this date, he has only ignored the alarm call a few times, including the discovery of a dinosaur's egg, the birth of Bamse's children, and a state of deep depression due to the false belief that his carelessness had caused the death of Bamse's children. None of the other characters come close to Skalman's intellectual level and he is sometimes seen playing chess with himself (he has stated that he has met and beaten the chess world champion). Rune Andréasson has stated that he brought the food-and-sleep clock into the series for much the same reason as the dunderhonung; during a dangerous adventure, Skalman could just pull something out of his carapace to save them, or help the trio with his intellect. That's when the food-and-sleep clock calls Skalman to sleep, forcing Bamse and Lille Skutt to think on their own.
 Vargen ("The Wolf") is a black wolf who was the original main villain (later anti-hero) of the comic; a criminal and a bully who at one point was named "World Champion of Evil" by his colleagues, but who later on proved to not be such a bad person if given a chance. Vargen grew up on the wrong side of the tracks and was introduced to a life of crime by his villainous stepfathers. When they eventually ended up in prison he knew that it was time to make a fresh start but his past turned against him as nobody wanted to give him the chance to better his life. Bamse, however, did, and eventually managed to reform the wolf by consistently treating him with kindness. Vargen occasionally slips back into his old ways, but as far as the other wolves are concerned he blew it by joining Bamse's club.

Antagonists 
 Krösus Sork ("Croesus Vole") is an often cruel capitalist and secondary villain of the comic; born as a banker's son he was forced to play second fiddle to his brother Slösus (rough translation "Wasteus") who couldn't put a foot wrong. After Slösus later won a lottery (ticket no 88), Krösus forged his own ticket (no 89), switched the tickets, claimed Slösus' prize and let the unknowing Slösus get detained for forgery while coming to pick up his prize. Slösus was devastated to discover the truth after his release and they had a falling-out. Meanwhile, Krösus built up his fortune with blood money and let other voles do the dirty jobs. While Krösus has on occasion showed some small shred of conscience, he is still by far the most amoral and ruthless of the comic's villains; willing to do just about anything for profit.
 Kapten Buster ("Captain Buster") and his three clumsy sideman pirates, Rusken, Slusken and Stollen. (Approximate translation: "Rover,  Sloven and Silly".) They are largely incompetent and unsuccessful, and have mostly given up their life at sea thanks to a tendency towards seasickness.
 Knocke & Smocke, ("Knocker & Socker") two large thugs with flat caps who have performed several unsuccessful criminal attempts. They usually rely mainly on brute force and are generally outwitted by Skalman or others.
 Reinard is a sly fox and the newest main villain of the comic; who became an addition to the crew in 2006. He is shown to engage in all kinds of villainy, from shoplifting to explicit attempts on Bamse's life (which, curiously, has resulted in no retribution, or even rebuking, from Bamse's side).

Moral values and criticism 
The magazine has educational goals. On special "school" pages, the characters educate the reader about animals, cultures, the Universe, and other subjects. They often deal with superstition, and Skalman's sceptical views ("I only believe in what I know") wins over those of his more naive friends. On the other hand, beings like trolls, tomtar and dragons exist on a very real plane in most of the stories. As the series has evolved, the values expressed have become more general and less ideological. A fact sheet written and published by Andreasson in 1983 following a trip to the People's Republic of China became very controversial as it seemed to praise Mao Zedong's dictatorial rule as a "liberation" and claimed that "nobody's starving anymore" in China under Communist single-party rule. It was later edited heavily when the adventure was reprinted in 2004.

Bamse and his friends are very clear about their views. They are strongly opposed to racism, bullying and violence. Bamse is not only the strongest bear in the world, but also the kindest, often repeating his slogan "Nobody gets better from being beaten". Bamse's own world seems to have strong implications of anarchism or libertarian socialism, combining private ownership with communitarian solidarity (from most of the characters), though a single policeman, Pontus Kask (named for his classic-style policeman's helmet, or "kask" in Swedish) and a small prison exists.

The original villain, a black wolf simply called Vargen ("The Wolf"), became a friend of Bamse after consistently being treated kindly. The only villain that is depicted as unredeemable is Krösus Sork ("Croesus Vole"), a crude capitalist who will do practically anything for money.

Films and other media 
Six animated black-and-white short films were produced for television in 1966. In 1972, seven more animated shorts were shown in colour. Another two shorts were released in 1981, and a direct-to-video movie became available in 1991.

The later colour films have aired frequently on TV in Sweden, and have been released on VHS and DVD. The black and white films had been unavailable to the general public for a long time, but were released on DVD by late 2006. The colour movies were low-budget productions with actor Olof Thunberg narrating and voicing all characters, but are considered to be classics. The musical theme, composed by Sten Carlberg, is easily recognised by most Swedes.

In 1993, a Game Boy game (in Swedish) was released, loosely based on the Bamse characters. The game was little more than a sprite replacement of Beam Software's Baby T-Rex and received generally poor reviews. The "Bamse version" has not been officially released outside Sweden.

In October 2006, forty years after Bamse was created, Ola Andréasson, the son of creator Rune Andréasson announced that an animated feature film would be made, featuring better animation, a full voice cast, and a budget of SEK 25 million. An estimated release date of 2012 for the film was proposed. It was finally released in 2014 as Bamse and the Thief City. The film was followed by Bamse and the Witch's Daughter in 2016.

Translations 
In the 1960s, there were a few translations of the series "Bamses skola" ("Bamse's school"), where the characters were given English names:

Bamse - Bamsy
Skalman - Professor Shellback
Lille Skutt - Little Frisky
Vargen - Willie
Farmor - Granny
Katten Janson (literally Janson the Cat) - Sooty

In this translation, the dunderhonung was given the name magic honey. However, in the 1980s, Andréasson referred to it in English as thunder-honey, which is the literal translation also used in the Netherlands and Belgium (donderhoning).

In the cancelled movie Bamse and the Time-Travel Machine from 2009, the names were translated differently:

Bamse - Bamse
Skalman - Shellman
Lille Skutt - Little Skip
Krösus Sork - Victor Vole
Dunderhonung - Superhoney

References

External links 
Bamse - Official site 
Official site for Bamses värld 
Bamse at IMDb

1966 establishments in Sweden
Television characters introduced in 1966
Comics characters introduced in 1966
Comics about bears
Comics about animals
Adventure comics
Humor comics
Fictional anthropomorphic characters
Fictional bears
Fictional Swedish people
1966 Swedish television series debuts
Animated television series about bears
Children's television characters
Television shows adapted into comics
1966 comics debuts
Comics adapted into animated films
Comics adapted into video games
Comics based on television series
Comics characters with superhuman strength
Swedish comic strips
Swedish comics adapted into films
Swedish comics characters
Male characters in television
Male characters in animation
Male characters in comics